Qonan Qaran (also Romanized as Qonān Qarān; also known as Qotāq Qarān and Qownāq Qerān) is a village in Yurchi-ye Gharbi Rural District, Kuraim District, Nir County, Ardabil Province, Iran. At the 2006 census, its population was 129, in 23 families.

References 

Towns and villages in Nir County